Eliška Purkyňová (16 November 1868 – 22 October 1933) was a Czechoslovakian politician. In 1920 she was one of the first group of women elected to the Chamber of Deputies.

Biography
Purkyňová was born Alžběta Josefa Čapková in Libochowitz in 1868. In 1915 she became head of the Central Association of Czech Women, and was a member of the bord of trustees of the Reform Gymnasium in Vinohrady. Following the independence of Czechoslovakia at the end of World War I, she began working for the Ministry of Social Welfare.

After being elected, she served as vice-chair of the Bohemian provincial branch of the CND. She initiated the construction of an elderly care home in Prague (today the Eliška Purkyňová Home for the Elderly), which she became the first director of in 1924. In 1923 she became a member of the initial board of the Little Entente of Women. She left parliament in 1925 after a single term in office.

She died in Prague in 1933.

References

1868 births
People from Libochovice
Czechoslovak women in politics
Czechoslovak civil servants
Members of the Chamber of Deputies of Czechoslovakia (1920–1925)
Czechoslovak National Democracy politicians
1933 deaths